Corunastylis is a genus of about 50 species of plants in the orchid family, Orchidaceae. Commonly called midge orchids or pygmy orchids, they are terrestrial, deciduous, perennial, tuberous herbs found in Australia, New Zealand and New Caledonia. They are similar to orchids in the genus Genoplesium and have been included with them in the past.

Description
Midge orchids are all terrestrial, perennial, deciduous, sympodial herbs. A single thin, hollow, cylinder-shaped long surrounds and is fused to the flowering stem with a short, free tip. From a few to up to fifty tiny flowers are crowded along a thin flowering stem. As with leek orchids (genus Prasophyllum), the flowers are inverted so that the labellum is above the column rather than below it. The sepals and petals are hairy in some species but glabrous in others, and often have a small gland near their tips. The labellum is attached by a small hinge and in some species vibrates in the slightest breeze.

Taxonomy and naming
In 1888, Robert Fitzgerald formally described Corunastylis apostasioides and published the description in Australian Orchids, the first time the name Corunastylis had been used. In 1889, Mueller changed the name to Prasophyllum apostasioides and in 1989, David Jones and Mark Clements placed it and most other species of Prasophyllum into Genoplesium. In 2002 Jones and Clements moved all the species of Genoplesium back into Corunastylis except for the New South Wales species Genoplesium baueri.

Not all authorities have accepted the move from Genoplesium to Corunastylis, including the World Checklist of Selected Plant Families maintained by Royal Botanic Gardens, Kew.

The genus name Corunastylis is derived from Greek words meaning "a thick stick" and "a style".

Distribution and habitat
Midge orchids are mainly endemic to eastern Australia, but two (C. nuda and C. pumila) occur in New Zealand and one (Corunastylis caloptera) is endemic to New Caledonia. They often grow in moist places with rushes or sedges, making tham difficult to see.

Ecology
Most species of Corunastylis are pollinated by small vinegar flies attracted by the scent produced by glands on the flowers, but a few are self-pollinating.

Species list
Although the name Corunastylis is not accepted by the World Checklist of Selected Plant Families, it is used by Australian authorities. The following is a list of Corunastylis species as recognised in Australia. Common names are those used by David Jones.

Corunastylis acuminata (R.S.Rogers) D.L.Jones & M.A.Clem. – pointed midge orchid
Corunastylis alticola (D.L.Jones & B.Gray) D.L.Jones & M.A.Clem. – tableland midge orchid
Corunastylis anthracina D.L.Jones – black midge orchid
Corunastylis apostasioides Fitzg. – freak midge orchid
Corunastylis archeri (Hook.f.) D.L.Jones & M.A.Clem. – elfin midge orchid
Corunastylis arrecta D.L.Jones  – erect midge orchid
Corunastylis bishopii (D.L.Jones) D.L.Jones & M.A.Clem.  – Gibraltar Range midge orchid
Corunastylis brachystachya  (Lindl.) D.L.Jones & M.A.Clem. – short spike midge orchid, Rocky Cape midge orchid
Corunastylis capparina  D.L.Jones
Corunastylis carecta  D.L.Jones & L.M.Copel.
Corunastylis ciliata  (Ewart & B.Rees) D.L.Jones & M.A.Clem. – fringed midge orchid
Corunastylis citriodora  (D.L.Jones & M.A.Clem.) D.L.Jones & M.A.Clem. - lemon scented midge orchid
Corunastylis clivicola  D.L.Jones (NSW, ACT)
Corunastylis conferta (D.L.Jones) D.L.Jones & M.A.Clem. – crowded midge orchid
Corunastylis cornuta D.L.Jones 
Corunastylis cranei (D.L.Jones) D.L.Jones & M.A.Clem.  – Blackall Ridge midge orchid
Corunastylis cuspidata D.L.Jones & L.M.Copel. 
Corunastylis densa (Fitzg.) D.L.Jones & M.A.Clem.  – dense midge orchid
Corunastylis despectans (Hook.f.) D.L.Jones & M.A.Clem. - sharp midge orchid
Corunastylis ectopa  (D.L.Jones) D.L.Jones & M.A.Clem. – Brindabella midge orchid
Corunastylis eriochila (Fitzg.) D.L.Jones & M.A.Clem. – Mount Wilson midge orchid
Corunastylis filiformis (Fitzg.) D.L.Jones & M.A.Clem. – glandular midge orchid
Corunastylis fimbriata (R.Br.) D.L.Jones & M.A.Clem. - fringed midge orchid
Corunastylis firthii  (L.Cady) D.L.Jones  – Firth's midge orchid
Corunastylis formosa  (D.L.Jones) D.L.Jones & M.A.Clem. – Cathcart midge orchid
Corunastylis insignis (D.L.Jones) D.L.Jones & M.A.Clem.  – dark midge orchid
Corunastylis laminata (Fitzg.) D.L.Jones & M.A.Clem.  – red midge orchid
Corunastylis leptochila  D.L.Jones
Corunastylis littoralis  (D.L.Jones) D.L.Jones & M.A.Clem. – Tuncurry midge orchid
Corunastylis morina  (D.L.Jones) D.L.Jones & M.A.Clem. – mulberry midge orchid
Corunastylis morrisii  (Nicholls) D.L.Jones & M.A.Clem. - bearded midge orchid
Corunastylis mucronata  (Rupp) D.L.Jones
Corunastylis nigricans (R.Br.) D.L.Jones & M.A.Clem. - Kangaroo Island midge orchid
Corunastylis nuda (Hook.f.) D.L.Jones & M.A.Clem. - tiny midge orchid
Corunastylis nudiscapa (Hook.f.) D.L.Jones & M.A.Clem. - brownish midge orchid
Corunastylis obovata  (Rupp) D.L.Jones
Corunastylis oligantha (D.L.Jones) D.L.Jones & M.A.Clem. – Mongarlowe midge orchid
Corunastylis ostrina  (D.L.Jones) D.L.Jones & M.A.Clem. – purple midge orchid
Corunastylis parvicalla (Rupp) D.L.Jones & M.A.Clem. – mountain-top midge orchid
Corunastylis pedersonii (D.L.Jones) D.L.Jones & M.A.Clem.  – Pederson's midge orchid
Corunastylis plumosa (Rupp) D.L.Jones & M.A.Clem. - Tallong midge orchid 
Corunastylis psammophila (D.L.Jones) D.L.Jones & M.A.Clem.  – coastal midge orchid
Corunastylis pumila (Hook.f.) D.L.Jones & M.A.Clem. - green midge orchid
Corunastylis rhyolitica  (D.L.Jones & M.A.Clem.) D.L.Jones & M.A.Clem. – Pambula midge orchid
Corunastylis rufa  (R.Br.) D.L.Jones & M.A.Clem. - rufous midge orchid
Corunastylis ruppii  (R.S.Rogers) D.L.Jones & M.A.Clem. – Rupp's midge orchid
Corunastylis sagittifera  (Rupp) D.L.Jones & M.A.Clem. – horned midge orchid
Corunastylis sigmoidea (D.L.Jones) D.L.Jones & M.A.Clem.  – Dave's Creek midge orchid
Corunastylis simulans (D.L.Jones) D.L.Jones & M.A.Clem.  – Blue Mountains midge orchid
Corunastylis stephensonii D.L.Jones
Corunastylis superba  (D.L.Jones) D.L.Jones & M.A.Clem. – pink midge orchid
Corunastylis systena  (D.L.Jones) D.L.Jones & M.A.Clem.  – Kangarooby midge orchid
Corunastylis tasmanica  (D.L.Jones) D.L.Jones & M.A.Clem.  – Tasmanian midge orchid
Corunastylis tecta  (D.L.Jones) D.L.Jones & M.A.Clem.  – Cardwell midge orchid
Corunastylis tenella  D.L.Jones & L.M.Copel. 
Corunastylis tepperi  (F.Muell. ex Tepper) D.L.Jones & M.A.Clem. – mallee midge orchid
Corunastylis trifida  (Rupp) D.L.Jones & L.M.Copel. – blackish midge orchid
Corunastylis turfosa (D.L.Jones) D.L.Jones & M.A.Clem. – alpine midge orchid
Corunastylis unica  (Rupp) D.L.Jones
Corunastylis valida  (D.L.Jones) D.L.Jones & M.A.Clem.  – Blackdown midge orchid
Corunastylis vernalis  (D.L.Jones) D.L.Jones & M.A.Clem.  – spring midge orchid
Corunastylis woollsii  (F.Muell.) D.L.Jones & M.A.Clem. – dark midge orchid

References

 
Diurideae genera
Orchids of Western Australia